A pyridinecarboxylic acid is any member of a group of organic compounds which are monocarboxylic derivatives of pyridine. Pyridinecarboxylic acid comes in three isomers:

Picolinic acid (2-pyridinecarboxylic acid)
Nicotinic acid (3-pyridinecarboxylic acid), also known as Niacin
Isonicotinic acid (4-pyridinecarboxylic acid)

All isomers share the molecular weight 123,11 g/mol and the chemical formula C6H5NO2.

Pyridines
Aromatic acids